Based in Brussels, Belgium, the International Polar Foundation (IPF) communicates and educates on polar science and polar research as a way to understand key environmental and climate mechanisms. The foundation also promotes innovative and multifaceted responses to the complex challenges raised by the need for action on sustainable development, and designed, built and operates the first zero emission Antarctic scientific research station Princess Elisabeth Antarctica. The IPF was founded in 2002 by polar explorer Alain Hubert, Hugo Decleir and André Berger.

See also
Princess Elisabeth Base

References

External links 
 International Polar Foundation
 Belgian Antarctic Research Station - Princess Elisabeth Station

Polar exploration
Environmental organisations based in Belgium